Nick Viergever (born 3 August 1989) is a Dutch professional footballer who plays as a defender for Utrecht. He also made three appearances for the Netherlands national team.

Club career

Sparta Rotterdam

Viergever made his debut in the Eredivisie with Sparta Rotterdam in a 1–1 draw with NEC on 10 May 2009, coming on as a substitute for Edwin van Bueren in the second half.

AZ Alkmaar
In the summer of 2010, Viergever moved to AZ. He was named as vice-captain behind Maarten Martens at the beginning of the 2012–13 season, after Niklas Moisander and Rasmus Elm had left the club. With Martens ruled out through a long-term injury, Viergever skippered AZ for the most of the season.

Ajax
On 24 May 2014, it was announced that Viergever had signed a four-year contract with Ajax. Viergever scored an important goal for Ajax against FC Schalke 04 in the quarter-finals of the UEFA Europa League. After a 2–0 victory in the first leg in Amsterdam Viergever saw his team trailing with 3–0 in the away game in Gelsenkirchen before hitting the net in 110th minute of extra time, sending his club to the semi-finals on away goals for the first time in over twenty years.

PSV
On 2 May 2018, Viergever signed a contract with PSV Eindhoven on a free transfer. Viergever said he understood the controversy with the move to Ajax arch rivals, however expressed his delight with signing with the Eredivisie champions.

Greuther Fürth
Viergever moved to Bundesliga newcomers Greuther Fürth on 31 August 2021, the last day of the 2021 summer transfer window. He signed a two-year contract.

Utrecht
On 16 May 2022, Viergever signed a two-year contract with Utrecht.

International career
On 7 May 2012, Viergever was one of nine uncapped players named in the provisional list of 36 players for the Euro 2012 tournament by Netherlands manager Bert van Marwijk. He did not make the final cut. On 15 August 2012, Viergever made his debut under new manager Louis van Gaal in the 4–2 away loss to Belgium in a friendly match.

Career statistics

Club

International

Honours
AZ
KNVB Cup: 2012–13

Ajax
UEFA Europa League runner-up: 2016–17

PSV Eindhoven
Johan Cruyff Shield: 2021

References

External links
 Voetbal International profile 
 Holland stats at OnsOranje 

1989 births
Living people
People from Capelle aan den IJssel
Dutch footballers
Association football defenders
Netherlands international footballers
Netherlands under-21 international footballers
Eredivisie players
Eerste Divisie players
Bundesliga players
Sparta Rotterdam players
AZ Alkmaar players
AFC Ajax players
Jong Ajax players
PSV Eindhoven players
SpVgg Greuther Fürth players
FC Utrecht players
Dutch expatriate footballers
Dutch expatriate sportspeople in Germany
Expatriate footballers in Germany
Footballers from South Holland